K-62 is an approximately  state highway in the U.S. state of Kansas. It is a north-south highway that serves towns in the northeastern part of the state. It parallels Soldier Creek for its entire length. K-62's southern terminus is at K-16 west of Holton and the northern terminus is at K-9 southwest of Goff.

Route description
K-62 begins in rural Jackson County at K-16. It proceeds north through rolling hills filled with fields.  north of its terminus, it crosses Soldier Creek for the first of three times, and proceeds another two miles to cross the creek again, before entering Soldier, the only city the highway passes directly through. In the town, K-62 turns west on Jackson Street for a block, and turns north again on 2nd Street. After leaving the town to the north, the remaining two miles of highway before entering Nemaha County, wind through tree laden hills, where it crosses Soldier Creek for the final time. Upon entering Nemaha County, it resumes a due north course, and the terrain flattens considerably.

The Kansas Department of Transportation (KDOT) tracks the traffic levels on its highways, and in 2019, they determined that on average the traffic varied from 225 vehicles per day slightly north of Soldier to 380 vehicles per day near the southern terminus. K-62 is not included in the National Highway System. The National Highway System is a system of highways important to the nation's defense, economy, and mobility.

History
K-62 first appeared on the map in 1927. Between 1931 and 1932, K-62 was realigned to intersect K-63 where it currently turns north into Nemaha County. Between 1933 and 1934, the highway was realigned to intersect K-63 slightly north of Havensville. Between 1934 and 1936, K-62 was truncated to end at the Pottawatomie–Jackson County line, east of Havensville. Between July 1938 and 1939, K-62 was extended west from the county line to K-63 slightly north of Havensville. Between 1944 and 1945, K-62 was truncated back to the Pottawatomie–Jackson County line. Between 1953 and 1956, the highway was realigned to continue north from Soldier.

Major junctions

References

External links

Kansas Department of Transportation State Map
KDOT: Historic State Maps

062
Transportation in Jackson County, Kansas
Transportation in Nemaha County, Kansas